James Johnston (17 September 1925 – 7 January 2003) was a Scotland international rugby union footballer. Johnston played as a Lock.

Rugby career

Amateur career

Johnston played for Melrose.

Provincial career

Johnston led a South team to play against South Africa in 1951-52.

He played in the first Scottish Inter-District Championship in season 1953-54.

International career

He was capped for  5 times between 1951 and 1952, with 4 caps in Five Nations matches.

Business

He founded Baxter Johnson Oils.

References

1925 births
2003 deaths
Scottish rugby union players
Scotland international rugby union players
Rugby union players from Scottish Borders
Melrose RFC players
South of Scotland District (rugby union) players
Rugby union locks